Stowbtsy District is a second-level administrative subdivision (raion) of Belarus in the Minsk Region.

Notable residents 

Jazep Losik (1884, Mikalajeŭščyna village - 1940), Belarusian academic, leading figure of the independence movement and a victim of Stalin’s purges

References

 
Districts of Minsk Region